Simon George Thomas  (born 28 December 1963) is a Welsh former politician who was a member of Plaid Cymru. He was a Member of Parliament (MP) for Ceredigion from 2000 to 2005, and an Assembly Member in the National Assembly for Wales  representing Mid and West Wales between 2011 and 2018.

He resigned as an Assembly Member and his party membership on 25 July 2018, following arrest by police on suspicion of possession of indecent images. On 3 October 2018, he pleaded guilty to three counts of making indecent images of children. On 31 October 2018 he was given a 26-week jail sentence, suspended for two years.

Early life
He went to Aberdare Boys' Grammar School (became Aberdare Boys' Comprehensive School in 1978). At the University of College Wales, Aberystwyth, he gained a BA in Welsh and Education in 1985. He gained a Postgraduate diploma (DipLib) from the College of Librarianship Wales (CLW) in Llanbadarn Fawr, Aberystwyth in 1988 (College became part of the university in 1989).

He was assistant curator for the National Library of Wales from 1986 to 1992. From 1992 to 1994, he was Policy and Research Officer for the Taff-Ely borough council. From 1994 to 2000, he was Rural Development Manager for the JIGSO rural development agency.

Thomas is the father of two children. At the time of his trial, he lived in Penparcau, a village south of Aberystwyth. Locals have raised concern that he lives on the same street as a primary school.

Political career
Thomas was elected as a Councillor in Ceredigion County Council for Aberystwyth East in 1999 and resigned after being elected a Member of Parliament. He was fifth on Plaid Cymru's regional list for Mid and West Wales in the inaugural National Assembly for Wales election in 1999; only list leader Cynog Dafis was elected.

Thomas was first elected as MP for Ceredigion in the 2000 by-election after Dafis stepped down to focus on his role as an Assembly member. On entering the House of Commons, he took the oath of allegiance in the Welsh language, and was heckled by some English MPs. He retained the seat for Plaid Cymru at the 2001 election with a reduced majority, and lost it in the 2005 general election to Mark Williams of the Liberal Democrats. During the 2005 general election he wrote a blog on the Channel 4 News website which shows a near daily account of his campaign trail and his thoughts following his defeat. Thomas said he had not expected his defeat. According to a BBC news report he said "I was getting a very positive response on the doorstep". In the aftermath of his defeat, he called for Plaid Cymru to reform its leadership arrangements and have a single leader "round which the party coalesces and around which the people of Wales can identify".

After the 2007 Welsh Assembly election, Simon Thomas was appointed a special adviser to the Plaid Cymru ministers in the Welsh Assembly Government coalition between his party and Labour.

In September 2010, Simon Thomas was placed at the top of Plaid Cymru's regional list for Mid and West Wales in the 2011 Welsh Assembly election with the incumbent Nerys Evans instead running for the constituency seat of Carmarthen West and South Pembrokeshire. He was elected to the National Assembly for Wales.

When a party leadership election was triggered by the resignation of Ieuan Wyn Jones, Thomas announced his candidacy on 1 December 2011. The following 6 February, he withdrew in favour of Elin Jones, running to become her deputy leader. The election was won by Leanne Wood.

In the 2016 Assembly Election, he also contested the constituency of Carmarthen West and South Pembrokeshire, coming third as Angela Burns retained it for the Conservatives.

Following the 2016 election he was elected unopposed as chair of the Assembly's Finance Committee, a position he held until July 2018.

United Kingdom parliamentary expenses scandal

As part of the investigation into United Kingdom parliamentary expenses scandal, Thomas was found to have over claimed £349.20 in mortgage interest between 2004 and 2005 under the additional costs allowance (ACA). He was recommended to repay this sum, by 1 April 2009 no money was repaid.

Arrest and resignation

On 25 July 2018 he resigned as an AM and from Plaid Cymru following his arrest by police on suspicion of possession of indecent images. His seat was taken by Helen Mary Jones, who was next in line on Plaid's regional list.

On 18 September he was charged by Dyfed-Powys Police with three counts of making indecent images of children. In the context of digital media, saving an indecent image to a computer's hard drive is considered to be "making" the image, as it causes a copy to exist which did not exist before.

He pleaded guilty to three counts of making indecent images at Aberystwyth Magistrates' Court on 3 October 2018, having made over 600 such images and videos. On 31 October 2018 he was given a 26-week jail sentence, suspended for two years by Mold Magistrates Courts and ordered to remain on the sex offenders register for seven years.

Electoral performance
Thomas contested several elections under the Plaid Cymru banner:

National Assembly Regional Seats

National Assembly Constituency Seats

Westminster Parliament elections

References

External links

 Guardian Unlimited Politics - Simon Thomas
 TheyWorkForYou.com - Simon Thomas
 The Public Whip - Simon Thomas
 BBC News - Simon Thomas profile 10 February 2005
 Channel 4, 2005 Election Blog
 Ex-Plaid MP fails in Assembly comeback

1963 births
Living people
Plaid Cymru MPs
UK MPs 1997–2001
UK MPs 2001–2005
Wales AMs 2011–2016
People from Ceredigion
People from Rhondda
People from Penparcau
People educated at Aberdare High School
Alumni of Aberystwyth University
Welsh-speaking politicians
Welsh politicians convicted of crimes
Welsh people convicted of child pornography offences